Dániel Gyollai (born 7 April 1997) is a Hungarian professional footballer, who plays as a goalkeeper for Maidenhead United. He has represented Hungary at various youth levels.

Career
Gyollai was born in Békéscsaba and started his youth career at hometown club Békéscsaba 1912 Előre in 2005.<ref>{{cite web |url=https://behir.hu/22-eves-voltam-es-197-centis-de-meg-mindig-en-voltam-a-dani-az-akademias |title="22 éves voltam és 197 centis, de még mindig én voltam Dani, az akadémiás" ("I was 22 and 197 inches, but I was still Dani, the academician") |last=Tamás |first=Such |website=Behir.hu|language=Hungarian |date=29 January 2020}}</ref> He left the club in 2011 to join the youth academy of Nemzeti Bajnokság I club Budapest Honvéd.

In 2013, he graduated from the Hungarian Football Academy and signed for English Premier League club Stoke City. Originally placed into the under-18 squad, Gyollai was moved to the under-21 squad in 2015 and was a regular name on the teamsheet in Premier League 2 and EFL Trophy matches.

After various senior games as an unused substitute for Stoke, in 2016, Gyollai joined Nantwich Town on loan. He went on to make 8 league appearances for the club. Impressing on his loan spell, in 2017, Gyollai re-joined The Dabbers once again on loan.

At the end of the 2018–19 season, Gyollai was released by Stoke City and on 1 August 2019 joined Championship side Wigan Athletic, penning a one-year deal.

On 30 July 2020, Gyollai signed for League One club Peterborough United on a two-year deal. He made his debut for the club on 8 September 2020, starting in a 3–3 draw at home to Burton Albion in the EFL Trophy, which The Posh'' won 5–4 on penalties.

On 11 May 2021, he was made available for transfer by Peterborough. He moved on loan to Maidenhead United in December 2021. After two league appearances, the transfer was made permanent in January 2022. He won the Supporters' Player of the Season award for the 2021-22 season.

Career statistics

References

1997 births
Living people
Hungarian footballers
Stoke City F.C. players
Wigan Athletic F.C. players
Peterborough United F.C. players
Association football goalkeepers
Hungarian expatriate footballers
Hungarian expatriate sportspeople in England
Expatriate footballers in England
Budapest Honvéd FC players
Békéscsaba 1912 Előre footballers
Nantwich Town F.C. players
Maidenhead United F.C. players
National League (English football) players
Northern Premier League players
People from Békéscsaba
Sportspeople from Békés County